"Pilot" is the first episode of the first season of the situation comedy Back to You. It aired on September 19, 2007.

Plot
In the 90s, Chuck Darling moves from his anchor post at a small T.V. markets news program in Pittsburgh to a much larger market in Denver.

Ten years later, Chuck is in L.A. and is fired after inadvertently going off on a profanity-filled rant that becomes widespread via online outlets (Kelly states that she saw it on YouTube).

Soon after, Chuck's back in Pittsburgh and reuniting with his former co-anchor, Kelly Carr, much to her protest; however, sports correspondent Marsh McGinley is thrilled.

Later, the reason behind Chuck and Kelly's friction is revealed. They slept together on a drunken New Year's Eve which resulted in Chuck becoming the father of Kelly's 10-year-old daughter. Chuck meets his daughter, Gracie, although he does not tell her that he is her father. At the end of the episode, Chuck calls Kelly, telling her that Gracie is spectacular.

Production details
Creators Levitan and Lloyd wrote the script for "Pilot", signed Grammer and Heaton, and brought in Burrows before approaching any of the networks.

The scene which features Chuck explaining to Kelly his various promotions was re-shot between the filming for the pilot episode and the original broadcast of the episode. Fox featured clips featuring the original scene during promos for the Pilot.

Reception

Tim Goodman of the San Francisco Chronicle described it as a "retro-sitcom" due to its multiple cameras and onscreen audience.  Charlie McCollum of the Mercury News felt that Back to You is this "season's highest-profile attempt to revitalize the traditional sitcom."

Mike Duffy of the Detroit Free Press felt that the first two episodes of Back to You found a "quality groove" and delivered laughs.  He described the shows news studio as a "natural for loopy, literate good fun" and thought that Grammer and Heaton made a good team.  Vinay Menon of The Toronto Star felt that based on the first two episodes, Back to You had elements in common with NewsRadio, Just Shoot Me!, Murphy Brown, and The Mary Tyler Moore Show.

"Pilot" debuted on a "highly competitive night", in terms of ratings.
This episode was viewed by 9.44 million viewers upon its original broadcast, finishing first place in its timeslot. It also achieved a 3.1 rating in the key 18-49 demographic. A noticeable year-to-year improvement was shown compared to the previous occupier of the timeslot, Bones.

It ranked an impressive 16th of the week's network programming which was higher than any other Fox series with the exception of The Simpsons and Family Guy.

References

External links
 

2007 American television episodes
Back to You (TV series) episodes
Back to You
Television episodes directed by James Burrows